S. Ravi is an Indian politician and incumbent member of the Tamil Nadu Legislative Assembly from the Arakkonam constituency. He represents the All India Anna Dravida Munnetra Kazhagam party.

Ravi was elected to be a member of the 14th Tamil Nadu Legislative Assembly From Arakkonam and was re-elected in the elections of 2016.

Electoral performance

References 

Tamil Nadu MLAs 2011–2016
Tamil Nadu MLAs 2016–2021
All India Anna Dravida Munnetra Kazhagam politicians
Living people
Year of birth missing (living people)
Tamil Nadu MLAs 2021–2026
Tamil Nadu politicians